Rowan Oak is William Faulkner's former home in Oxford, Mississippi. It is a primitive Greek Revival house built in the 1840s by Colonel Robert Sheegog, an Irish immigrant planter from Tennessee. Faulkner purchased the house when it was in disrepair in 1930 and did many of the renovations himself. Other renovations were done in the 1950s. One of its more famous features is the outline of Faulkner's Pulitzer Prize–winning novel A Fable, penciled in graphite and red on the plaster walls of his office. It is now owned and operated by the University of Mississippi as a museum, and is open to visitors year-round.

History
The house sits on four landscaped acres, surrounded by 29 acres of woods known as Bailey Woods. The original owners, The Sheegogs, lived in the home from 1844 to 1872. The home originally was designed with an L-shaped layout with a 450 square foot center hall connecting a parlor and dining room on one side with a library on the other. A quarter-turn stair led to the second floor and its three bedrooms.

In 1872, the Bailey family purchased the home and resided there until 1923. Around the turn of the century, Julia Bailey added an indoor kitchen and pantry, enclosed a dogtrot hallway in the servants' area, a front porch, and a bathroom.

The property had been unoccupied for seven years before William Faulkner purchased it in 1930. He renamed the property "Rowan Oak" after the rowan tree of Scotland, symbolizing peace and security, and the live oak, symbolizing strength and solitude. Neither of those trees can be found on the property, but the grounds and surrounding woods of Rowan Oak contain hundreds of species of native Mississippi plants, most of which date back to antebellum times. The alley of cedars that line the driveway were common in the 19th century, as it was believed that cedar trees purified the air of the yellow fever virus. Rowan Oak was William Faulkner's private world, in reality and imagination, and he was fascinated with its history. During his time at Rowan Oak, Faulkner kept horses on the property for riding, jumping and, occasionally, fox hunting, and he would often attend athletics events at nearby Ole Miss.

In the 1930s, Faulkner installed brick terraces with balustrades framing the front portico, added a porch off the dining room, a porte-cochère on the home's west side, and a fourth bedroom, as well as other structural changes. In the 1950s, he oversaw other updates, including the enclosing of the rear porch on the ground floor for use as a study or office.

Faulkner's years at spent at Rowan Oak were productive as he set stories and novels to paper, ultimately winning the Nobel Prize for Literature in 1949, and the Pulitzer Prize and National Book Award for A Fable in 1954.

Preservation

In 1972, the University of Mississippi purchased Rowan Oak. The home is preserved as it was at the time of Faulkner's death in 1962. The university maintains the home in order to promote Faulkner's literary legacy, and it is open to visitors year-round. The home has been visited by such writers as John Updike, Czesław Miłosz, Charles Simic, Richard Ford, James Lee Burke, Bei Dao, Charles Wright, Charles Frazier, Alice Walker, the Coen brothers, Bobbie Ann Mason, Salman Rushdie, and others. Writer Mark Richard once repaired a faulty doorknob on the French door to Faulkner's study.

Rowan Oak was declared a National Historic Landmark in 1968.

The current curator of Rowan Oak is William Griffith. Past curators include the novelists Howard Bahr and Cynthia Shearer. The original curator was Bev Smith, an Ole Miss alumna, who was responsible for finding a large number of Faulkner's original manuscripts hidden within the closet under the stairs in the home.

References

External links

Official Website, includes visitor information, business hours, and more
Inside Rowan Oak:  short video about Faulkner and Rowan Oak, with Close-Ups of a Novel Draft that Faulkner Wrote on His Office Wall
A Photo Tour of Rowan Oak, With Commentary
William Faulkner on the Web – Includes detailed, interactive map of the grounds
"Writings of William Faulkner", broadcast from Rowan Oak from C-SPAN's American Writers

William Faulkner
Houses completed in 1844
Houses in Lafayette County, Mississippi
National Historic Landmarks in Mississippi
Historic house museums in Mississippi
Buildings and structures at the University of Mississippi
Museums in Lafayette County, Mississippi
Biographical museums in Mississippi
Literary museums in the United States
Mississippi Landmarks
National Register of Historic Places in Lafayette County, Mississippi
Homes of American writers